Ianoș Brînză (born 12 September 1998) is a Moldovan professional footballer who plays as a goalkeeper for Liga II club Politehnica Iași. Brînză started his career at Dacia Chișinău, then played for Politehnica Iași, before signing for FC Botoșani in the summer of 2017.

References

External links
 
 
 Ianoș Brînză at LPF.ro

1998 births
Living people
Footballers from Chișinău
Moldovan footballers
Association football goalkeepers
Moldovan Super Liga players
FC Dacia Chișinău players
Liga I players
FC Politehnica Iași (2010) players
FC Botoșani players
Liga II players
FC Petrolul Ploiești players
Moldovan expatriate footballers
Moldovan expatriate sportspeople in Romania
Expatriate footballers in Romania